Albuera was launched at Sunderland in 1811. She was wrecked in November 1827.

She first appeared in Lloyd's Register (LR) in 1811 with J.Johnson, master, J.Lang, owner, trade London transport.

A gale drove Albuera ashore near Memel, Prussia on 4 November 1827. The Memel Lifeboat rescued the crew. She was on a voyage from Belfast.

Citations

1811 ships
Age of Sail merchant ships of England
Maritime incidents in November 1827